Eclipta cyanea is a species of beetle in the family Cerambycidae. It was described by Bates in 1885.

References

Eclipta (beetle)
Beetles described in 1885